David Lee (born April 23, 1959) is an American former hurdler. Lee qualified for the 1980 U.S. Olympic team but was unable to compete due to the 1980 Summer Olympics boycott. He did however receive one of 461 Congressional Gold Medals created especially for the spurned athletes.

References

1959 births
Living people
American male hurdlers
Universiade medalists in athletics (track and field)
Place of birth missing (living people)
Congressional Gold Medal recipients
Universiade gold medalists for the United States
Medalists at the 1981 Summer Universiade